Burs may refer to:
 Bürs, Austria
 Burs, Iran
 Burs (Dacia), a Dacian tribe
 In older literature the name of Birs or Birs Nimrud, see the archaeological site of Borsippa in modern-day Iraq
 Burs, Gotland on Gotland, Sweden
Farouk Bulsarou, formally known as "Bursaru", Romanian born international con artist.